Totally Top Trumps was a British gameshow that aired on Challenge for 20 episodes in 2004. It was presented by Andy Goldstein and supported by captains Rob Deering, Dan Clark and scorer/quiz geek Jack Waley-Cohen. It was loosely based on the card game Top Trumps.

Format
There were four rounds to the show, involving two teams of celebrities who battled it out for the trump card. Questions ranged from classic cars and football, to 80s film and television.

Celebrity guests
Celebrities who appeared on the show included: 
Ewen MacIntosh
Kate Lawler
Rowland Rivron
Marcus Brigstocke
Robert Llewellyn
Vicki Butler-Henderson

References

External links
 Totally Top Trumps at UKGameshows.com

2004 British television series debuts
2004 British television series endings
2000s British game shows
English-language television shows
Television series by Banijay